SD Powerful is a Twin Tractor Unit Tug operated by Serco Marine Services  in support of the United Kingdom's Naval Service. The ship was formerly operated by the Royal Maritime Auxiliary Service until its disbandment in March 2008.

See also
Naval Service (United Kingdom)
List of ships of Serco Marine Services

References

Royal Maritime Auxiliary Service
Serco Marine Services (ships)
Tugboats of the United Kingdom
1985 ships